Florence Montreynaud (born ) is a French feminist.

Biography  
Montreynaud was born in 1948. Her mother was a painter and her father was an engineer. She currently lives in Paris, and previously lived in the department of Oise. In 1970 she gained a diploma from the Paris Institute of Political Studies after gaining a degree and master's in Russian.

In 1971, she joined the Women's Liberation Movement and Family Planning in Paris. She launched the petition which led to the opening of the Family Planning Centre in Senlis. She participates in many conversations regarding sexuality in lycées and universities with Family Planning.

References 

1948 births
French feminists
Sciences Po alumni
Living people